Ramesses II, commonly known as Ramesses the Great, was an Egyptian pharaoh. He was the third ruler of the Nineteenth Dynasty. Along with Thutmose III of the Eighteenth Dynasty, he is often regarded as the greatest, most celebrated, and most powerful pharaoh of the New Kingdom, which itself was the most powerful period of ancient Egypt.

In ancient Greek sources, he is called Ozymandias, derived from the first part of his Egyptian-language regnal name: . Ramesses was also referred to as the "Great Ancestor" by successor pharaohs and the Egyptian people.

At age fourteen, he was appointed as Egypt's prince regent by his father, Seti I. Today, most Egyptologists believe that Ramesses formally assumed the throne on 31 May 1279 BC, based on his known accession date: III Season of the Harvest, day 27.

For the early part of his reign, he focused on building cities, temples, and monuments. After establishing the city of Pi-Ramesses in the Nile Delta, he designated it as Egypt's new capital and used it as the main staging point for his campaigns in Syria. Ramesses led several military expeditions into the Levant, where he reasserted Egyptian control over Canaan and Phoenicia; he also led a number of expeditions into Nubia, all commemorated in inscriptions at Beit el-Wali and Gerf Hussein. He celebrated an unprecedented thirteen or fourteen Sed festivals — more than any other pharaoh.

Estimates of his age at death vary, though 90 or 91 is considered to be the most likely figure. Upon his death, he was buried in a tomb (KV7) in the Valley of the Kings; his body was later moved to the Royal Cache, where it was discovered by archaeologists in 1881. Ramesses' mummy is now on display at the National Museum of Egyptian Civilization, located in the city of Cairo.

Military campaigns

Early in his life, Ramesses II embarked on numerous campaigns to restore possession of previously held territories lost to the Nubians and Hittites and to secure Egypt's borders. He was also responsible for suppressing some Nubian revolts and carrying out a campaign in Libya. Though the Battle of Kadesh often dominates the scholarly view of Ramesses II's military prowess and power, he nevertheless enjoyed more than a few outright victories over Egypt's enemies. During his reign, the Egyptian army is estimated to have totaled some 100,000 men: a formidable force that he used to strengthen Egyptian influence.

Battle against Sherden pirates
In his second year, Ramesses II decisively defeated the Sherden sea pirates who were wreaking havoc along Egypt's Mediterranean coast by attacking cargo-laden vessels travelling the sea routes to Egypt. The Sherden people probably came from the coast of Ionia, from southwest Anatolia or perhaps, also from the island of Sardinia. Ramesses posted troops and ships at strategic points along the coast and patiently allowed the pirates to attack their perceived prey before skillfully catching them by surprise in a sea battle and capturing them all in a single action. A stele from Tanis speaks of their having come "in their war-ships from the midst of the sea, and none were able to stand before them". There probably was a naval battle somewhere near the mouth of the Nile, as shortly afterward, many Sherden are seen among the pharaoh's body-guard where they are conspicuous by their horned helmets having a ball projecting from the middle, their round shields, and the great Naue II swords with which they are depicted in inscriptions of the Battle of Kadesh. In that sea battle, together with the Sherden, the pharaoh also defeated the Lukka (L'kkw, possibly the people later known as the Lycians), and the Šqrsšw (Shekelesh) peoples.

First Syrian campaign

The immediate antecedents to the Battle of Kadesh were the early campaigns of Ramesses II into Canaan. His first campaign seems to have taken place in the fourth year of his reign and was commemorated by the erection of what became the first of the Commemorative stelae of Nahr el-Kalb near what is now Beirut. The inscription is almost totally illegible due to weathering.

In the fourth year of his reign, he captured the Hittite vassal state of the Amurru during his campaign in Syria.

Second Syrian campaign

Battle of Kadesh 
The Battle of Kadesh in his fifth regnal year was the climactic engagement in a campaign that Ramesses fought in Syria, against the resurgent Hittite forces of Muwatallis. The pharaoh wanted a victory at Kadesh both to expand Egypt's frontiers into Syria, and to emulate his father Seti I's triumphal entry into the city just a decade or so earlier. He also constructed his new capital, Pi-Ramesses. There he built factories to manufacture weapons, chariots, and shields, supposedly producing some 1,000 weapons in a week, about 250 chariots in two weeks, and 1,000 shields in a week and a half. After these preparations, Ramesses moved to attack territory in the Levant, which belonged to a more substantial enemy than any he had ever faced in war: the Hittite Empire.

Ramesses's forces were caught in a Hittite ambush and outnumbered at Kadesh when they counterattacked and routed the Hittites, whose survivors abandoned their chariots and swam the Orontes river to reach the safe city walls. Ramesses, logistically unable to sustain a long siege, returned to Egypt.

Third Syrian campaign
Egypt's sphere of influence was now restricted to Canaan while Syria fell into Hittite hands. Canaanite princes, seemingly encouraged by the Egyptian incapacity to impose their will and goaded on by the Hittites, began revolts against Egypt. In the seventh year of his reign, Ramesses II returned to Syria once again. This time he proved more successful against his Hittite foes. During this campaign he split his army into two forces. One force was led by his son, Amun-her-khepeshef, and it chased warriors of the Šhasu tribes across the Negev as far as the Dead Sea, capturing Edom-Seir. It then marched on to capture Moab. The other force, led by Ramesses, attacked Jerusalem and Jericho. He, too, then entered Moab, where he rejoined his son. The reunited army then marched on Hesbon, Damascus, on to Kumidi, and finally, recaptured Upi (the land around Damascus), reestablishing Egypt's former sphere of influence.

Later Syrian campaigns

Ramesses extended his military successes in his eighth and ninth years. He crossed the Dog River (Nahr al-Kalb) and pushed north into Amurru. His armies managed to march as far north as Dapur, where he had a statue of himself erected. The Egyptian pharaoh thus found himself in northern Amurru, well past Kadesh, in Tunip, where no Egyptian soldier had been seen since the time of Thutmose III, almost 120 years earlier. He laid siege to the city before capturing it. His victory proved to be ephemeral. In year nine, Ramesses erected a stele at Beth Shean. After having reasserted his power over Canaan, Ramesses led his army north. A mostly illegible stele near Beirut, which appears to be dated to the king's second year, was probably set up there in his tenth. The thin strip of territory pinched between Amurru and Kadesh did not make for a stable possession. Within a year, they had returned to the Hittite fold, so that Ramesses had to march against Dapur once more in his tenth year. This time he claimed to have fought the battle without even bothering to put on his corslet, until two hours after the fighting began. Six of Ramesses's youthful sons, still wearing their side locks, took part in this conquest. He took towns in Retjenu, and Tunip in Naharin, later recorded on the walls of the Ramesseum. This second success at the location was equally as meaningless as his first, as neither power could decisively defeat the other in battle.

Peace treaty with the Hittites

The deposed Hittite king, Mursili III, fled to Egypt, the land of his country's enemy, after the failure of his plots to oust his uncle from the throne. Ḫattušili III responded by demanding that Ramesses II extradite his nephew back to Hatti.

This demand precipitated a crisis in relations between Egypt and Hatti when Ramesses denied any knowledge of Mursili's whereabouts in his country, and the two empires came dangerously close to war. Eventually, in the twenty-first year of his reign (1258 BC), Ramesses decided to conclude an agreement with the new Hittite king, Ḫattušili III, at Kadesh to end the conflict. The ensuing document is the earliest known peace treaty in world history.

The peace treaty was recorded in two versions, one in Egyptian hieroglyphs, the other in Hittite, using cuneiform script; both versions survive. Such dual-language recording is common to many subsequent treaties. This treaty differs from others, in that the two language versions are worded differently. While the majority of the text is identical, the Hittite version says the Egyptians came suing for peace and the Egyptian version says the reverse. The treaty was given to the Egyptians in the form of a silver plaque, and this "pocket-book" version was taken back to Egypt and carved into the temple at Karnak.

The treaty was concluded between Ramesses II and Ḫattušili III in year 21 of Ramesses's reign (c. 1258 BC). Its 18 articles call for peace between Egypt and Hatti and then proceeds to maintain that their respective deities also demand peace. The frontiers are not laid down in this treaty, but may be inferred from other documents. The Anastasy A papyrus describes Canaan during the latter part of the reign of Ramesses II and enumerates and names the Phoenician coastal towns under Egyptian control. The harbour town of Sumur, north of Byblos, is mentioned as the northernmost town belonging to Egypt, suggesting it contained an Egyptian garrison.

No further Egyptian campaigns in Canaan are mentioned after the conclusion of the peace treaty. The northern border seems to have been safe and quiet, so the rule of the pharaoh was strong until Ramesses II's death, and the waning of the dynasty. When the King of Mira attempted to involve Ramesses in a hostile act against the Hittites, the Egyptian responded that the times of intrigue in support of Mursili III, had passed. Ḫattušili III wrote to Kadashman-Enlil II, Kassite king of Karduniaš (Babylon) in the same spirit, reminding him of the time when his father, Kadashman-Turgu, had offered to fight Ramesses II, the king of Egypt. The Hittite king encouraged the Babylonian to oppose another enemy, which must have been the king of Assyria, whose allies had killed the messenger of the Egyptian king. Ḫattušili encouraged Kadashman-Enlil to come to his aid and prevent the Assyrians from cutting the link between the Canaanite province of Egypt and Mursili III, the ally of Ramesses.

Nubian campaigns

Ramesses II also campaigned south of the first cataract of the Nile into Nubia. When Ramesses was about 22, two of his own sons, including Amun-her-khepeshef, accompanied him in at least one of those campaigns. By the time of Ramesses, Nubia had been a colony for 200 years, but its conquest was recalled in decoration from the temples Ramesses II built at Beit el-Wali (which was the subject of epigraphic work by the Oriental Institute during the Nubian salvage campaign of the 1960s), Gerf Hussein and Kalabsha in northern Nubia. On the south wall of the Beit el-Wali temple, Ramesses II is depicted charging into battle against tribes south of Egypt in a war chariot, while his two young sons, Amun-her-khepsef and Khaemwaset, are shown behind him, also in war chariots. A wall in one of Ramesses's temples says he had to fight one battle with those tribes without help from his soldiers.

Libyan campaigns
During the reign of Ramesses II, the Egyptians were evidently active on a  stretch along the Mediterranean coast, at least as far as Zawyet Umm El Rakham, where remains of a fortress described by its texts as built on Libyans land have been found. Although the exact events surrounding the foundation of the coastal forts and fortresses is not clear, some degree of political and military control must have been held over the region to allow their construction. 

There are no detailed accounts of Ramesses II's undertaking large military actions against the Libyans, only generalised records of his conquering and crushing them, which may or may not refer to specific events that were otherwise unrecorded. It may be that some of the records, such as the Aswan Stele of his year 2, are harking back to Ramesses's presence on his father's Libyan campaigns. Perhaps it was Seti I who achieved this supposed control over the region, and who planned to establish the defensive system, in a manner similar to how he rebuilt those to the east, the Ways of Horus across Northern Sinai.

Sed festivals

After reigning for 30 years, Ramesses joined a select group that included only a handful of Egypt's longest-lived rulers. By tradition, in the 30th year of his reign Ramesses celebrated a jubilee called the Sed festival. These were held to honour and rejuvenate the pharaoh's strength. Only halfway through what would be a 66-year reign, Ramesses had already eclipsed all but a few of his greatest predecessors in his achievements. He had brought peace, maintained Egyptian borders, and built great and numerous monuments across the empire. His country was more prosperous and powerful than it had been in nearly a century.

Sed festivals traditionally were held again every three years after the 30th year; Ramesses II, who sometimes held them after two years, eventually celebrated an unprecedented thirteen or fourteen.

Building projects and monuments

In the third year of his reign, Ramesses started the most ambitious building project after the pyramids, which were built almost 1,500 years earlier. The population was put to work changing the face of Egypt. Ramesses built extensively from the Delta to Nubia, "covering the land with buildings in a way no monarch before him had."

Some of the activities undertaken were focused on remodeling or usurping existing works, improving masonry techniques, and using art as propaganda.
In Thebes, the ancient temples were transformed, so that each one of them reflected honour to Ramesses as a symbol of his putative divine nature and power. 
The elegant but shallow reliefs of previous pharaohs were easily transformed, and so their images and words could easily be obliterated by their successors. Ramesses insisted that his carvings be deeply engraved into the stone, which made them not only less susceptible to later alteration, but also made them more prominent in the Egyptian sun, reflecting his relationship with the sun deity, Ra.
Ramesses used art as a means of propaganda for his victories over foreigners, which are depicted on numerous temple reliefs.
His cartouches are prominently displayed even in buildings that he did not construct.
 He also founded a new capital city in the Delta during his reign, called Pi-Ramesses. It previously had served as a summer palace during Seti I's reign.
 
Ramesses also undertook many new construction projects.   Two of his biggest works, besides Pi-Ramesses, were the temple complex of Abu Simbel and the Ramesseum, a mortuary temple in  western Thebes.

Pi-Ramesses

Ramesses II moved the capital of his kingdom from Thebes in the Nile valley to a new site in the eastern Delta. His motives are uncertain, although he possibly wished to be closer to his territories in Canaan and Syria. The new city of Pi-Ramesses (or to give the full name, Pi-Ramesses Aa-nakhtu, meaning "Domain of Ramesses, Great in Victory") was dominated by huge temples and his vast residential palace, complete with its own zoo. In the 10th century AD, the Bible exegete Rabbi Saadia Gaon believed that the biblical site of Ramesses had to be identified with Ain Shams. For a time, during the early 20th century, the site was misidentified as that of Tanis, due to the amount of statuary and other material from Pi-Ramesses found there, but it now is recognized that the Ramesside remains at Tanis were brought there from elsewhere, and the real Pi-Ramesses lies about 30 km (18.6 mi) south, near modern Qantir. The colossal feet of the statue of Ramesses are almost all that remains above ground today. The rest is buried in the fields.

Ramesseum

The temple complex built by Ramesses II between Qurna and the desert has been known as the Ramesseum since the 19th century. The Greek historian Diodorus Siculus marveled at the gigantic temple, now no more than a few ruins.

Oriented northwest and southeast, the temple was preceded by two courts. An enormous pylon stood before the first court, with the royal palace at the left and the gigantic statue of the king looming up at the back. Scenes of the great pharaoh and his army triumphing over the Hittite forces fleeing before Kadesh are represented on the pylon. Remains of the second court include part of the internal facade of the pylon and a portion of the Osiride portico on the right. Scenes of war and the alleged rout of the Hittites at Kadesh are repeated on the walls. In the upper registers, feast and honor of the phallic deity Min, god of fertility.

On the opposite side of the court the few Osiride pillars and columns still remaining may furnish an idea of the original grandeur. Scattered remains of the two statues of the seated king also may be seen, one in pink granite and the other in black granite, which once flanked the entrance to the temple. Thirty-nine out of the forty-eight columns in the great hypostyle hall (41 × 31 m) still stand in the central rows. They are decorated with the usual scenes of the king before various deities. Part of the ceiling, decorated with gold stars on a blue ground, also has been preserved. Ramesses's children appear in the procession on the few walls left. The sanctuary was composed of three consecutive rooms, with eight columns and the tetrastyle cell. Part of the first room, with the ceiling decorated with astral scenes, and few remains of the second room are all that is left. Vast storerooms built of mud bricks stretched out around the temple. Traces of a school for scribes were found among the ruins.

A temple of Seti I, of which nothing remains beside the foundations, once stood to the right of the hypostyle hall.

Abu Simbel

In 1255 BC, Ramesses and his queen Nefertari had traveled into Nubia to inaugurate a new temple, the great Abu Simbel. It is ego cast into stone; the man who built it intended not only to become Egypt's greatest pharaoh, but also one of its deities.

The great temple of Ramesses II at Abu Simbel was discovered in 1813 by the Swiss Orientalist and traveler Johann Ludwig Burckhardt. An enormous pile of sand almost completely covered the facade and its colossal statues, blocking the entrance for four more years. The Paduan explorer Giovanni Battista Belzoni reached the interior on 4 August 1817.

Other Nubian monuments
As well as the temples of Abu Simbel, Ramesses left other monuments to himself in Nubia. His early campaigns are illustrated on the walls of the Temple of Beit el-Wali (now relocated to New Kalabsha). Other temples dedicated to Ramesses are Derr and Gerf Hussein (also relocated to New Kalabsha).
For the temple of Amun at Jebel Barkal, the temple's foundation probably occurred during the reign of Thutmose III, while the temple was shaped during his reign and that of Ramses II.

Archeological discoveries

Colossal statue

The colossal statue of Ramesses II dates back 3,200 years, and was originally discovered in six pieces in a temple near Memphis. In August 2006, contractors relocated it to save it from exhaust fumes that were causing it to deteriorate. The new site is near the future Grand Egyptian Museum.

Festival chair
In 2018, a group of archeologists in Cairo's Matariya neighborhood discovered pieces of a booth with a seat that, based on its structure and age, may have been used by Ramesses. "The royal compartment consists of four steps leading to a cubic platform, which is believed to be the base of the king's seat during celebrations or public gatherings," such as Ramesses' inauguration and Sed festivals. It may have also gone on to be used by others in the Ramesside Period, according to the mission's head. The excavation mission also unearthed "a collection of scarabs, amulets, clay pots and blocks engraved with hieroglyphic text."

Granite bust
In December 2019, a red granite royal bust of Ramesses II was unearthed by an Egyptian archaeological mission in the village of Mit Rahina in Giza. The bust depicted Ramesses II wearing a wig with the symbol "Ka" on his head. Its measurements were 55 cm (21.65 in) wide, 45 cm (17.71 in) thick and 105 cm (41.33 in) long. Alongside the bust, limestone blocks appeared showing Ramesses II during the Heb-Sed religious ritual. "This discovery is considered one of the rarest archaeological discoveries. It is the first-ever Ka statue made of granite to be discovered. The only Ka statue that was previously found is made of wood and it belongs to one of the kings of the 13th dynasty of ancient Egypt which is displayed at the Egyptian Museum in Tahrir Square," said archaeologist Mostafa Waziri.

Death and burial
The Egyptian scholar Manetho (third century BC) attributed Ramesses a reign of 66 years and 2 months.

By the time of his death, aged about 90 years, Ramesses was suffering from severe dental problems and was plagued by arthritis and hardening of the arteries. He had made Egypt rich from all the supplies and bounty he had collected from other empires. He had outlived many of his wives and children and left great memorials all over Egypt. Nine more pharaohs took the name Ramesses in his honour.

Mummy

Originally Ramesses II was buried in the tomb KV7 in the Valley of the Kings, but because of looting, priests later transferred the body to a holding area, re-wrapped it, and placed it inside the tomb of queen Ahmose Inhapy. Seventy-two hours later it was again moved, to the tomb of the high priest Pinedjem II. All of this is recorded in hieroglyphics on the linen covering the body of the coffin of Ramesses II. His mummy was eventually discovered in 1881 in TT320 inside an ordinary wooden coffin and is now in Cairo's National Museum of Egyptian Civilization (until 3 April 2021 it was in the Egyptian Museum).

The pharaoh's mummy reveals an aquiline nose and strong jaw. Gaston Maspero, who first unwrapped the mummy of Ramesses II, writes, "on the temples there are a few sparse hairs, but at the poll the hair is quite thick, forming smooth, straight locks about five centimeters in length. White at the time of death, and possibly auburn during life, they have been dyed a light red by the spices (henna) used in embalming...the moustache and beard are thin...The hairs are white, like those of the head and eyebrows...the skin is of earthy brown, splotched with black... the face of the mummy gives a fair idea of the face of the living king."

In 1975, Maurice Bucaille, a French doctor, examined the mummy at the Cairo Museum and found it in poor condition. French President Valéry Giscard d'Estaing succeeded in convincing Egyptian authorities to send the mummy to France for treatment. In September 1976, it was greeted at Paris–Le Bourget Airport with full military honours befitting a king, then taken to a laboratory at the Musée de l'Homme.

The mummy was forensically tested in 1976 by Pierre-Fernand Ceccaldi, the chief forensic scientist at the Criminal Identification Laboratory of Paris. Ceccaldi observed that the mummy had slightly wavy, red hair; from this trait combined with cranial features, he concluded that Ramesses II was of a "Berber type" and hence – according to Ceccaldi's analysis – fair-skinned. Subsequent microscopic inspection of the roots of Ramesses II's hair proved that the king's hair originally was red, which suggests that he came from a family of redheads. This has more than just cosmetic significance: in ancient Egypt people with red hair were associated with the deity Set, the slayer of Osiris, and the name of Ramesses II's father, Seti I, means "follower of Seth". 

However, Cheikh Anta Diop disputed the results of the study and argued that the structure of hair morphology cannot determine the ethnicity of a mummy and that a comparative study should have featured Nubians in Upper Egypt before a conclusive judgement was reached. In 2006, French police arrested a man who tried to sell several tufts of Ramesses' hair on the Internet. Jean-Michel Diebolt said he had gotten the relics from his late father, who worked on the analysis team in the 1970s. They were returned to Egypt the following year.

In 1980, James Harris and Edward F. Wente conducted a series of X-ray examinations on New Kingdom Pharaohs crania and skeletal remains, which included the mummified remains of Ramesses II. The analysis in general found strong similarities between the New Kingdom rulers of the 19th Dynasty and 20th Dynasty with Mesolithic Nubian samples. The authors also noted affinities with modern Mediterranean populations of Levantine origin. Harris and Wente suggested that this represented admixture as the Rammessides were of northern origin.

During the examination, scientific analysis revealed battle-wounds, old fractures, arthritis and poor circulation. Ramesses II's arthritis is believed to have made him walk with a hunched back for the last decades of his life. A 2004 study excluded ankylosing spondylitis as a possible cause and proposed diffuse idiopathic skeletal hyperostosis as a possible alternative, which was confirmed by more recent work. A significant hole in the pharaoh's mandible was detected. Researchers observed "an abscess by his teeth (which) was serious enough to have caused death by infection, although this cannot be determined with certainty".

After being irradiated in an attempt to eliminate fungi and insects, the mummy was returned from Paris to Egypt in May 1977.

In April 2021, his mummy was moved from the Egyptian Museum to the National Museum of Egyptian Civilization along with those of 17 other kings and 4 queens in an event termed the Pharaohs' Golden Parade.

Burial of wives and relatives

Tomb of Nefertari

The tomb of the most important consort of Ramesses was discovered by Ernesto Schiaparelli in 1904. Although it had been looted in ancient times, the tomb of Nefertari is extremely important, because its magnificent wall-painting decoration is regarded as one of the greatest achievements of ancient Egyptian art. A flight of steps cut out of the rock gives access to the antechamber, which is decorated with paintings based on chapter seventeen of the Book of the Dead. The astronomical ceiling represents the heavens and is painted in dark blue, with a myriad of golden five-pointed stars. The east wall of the antechamber is interrupted by a large opening flanked by representation of Osiris at the left and Anubis at the right; this in turn leads to the side chamber, decorated with offering-scenes, preceded by a vestibule in which the paintings portray Nefertari presented to the deities, who welcome her. Originally, the queen's red granite sarcophagus lay in the middle of this chamber. According to religious doctrines of the time, it was in this chamber, which the ancient Egyptians called the Golden Hall, that the regeneration of the deceased took place. This decorative pictogram of the walls in the burial-chamber drew inspiration from chapters 144 and 146 of the Book of the Dead: in the left half of the chamber, there are passages from chapter 144 concerning the gates and doors of the kingdom of Osiris, their guardians, and the magic formulas that had to be uttered by the deceased in order to go past the doors.

Tomb KV5

In 1995, Professor Kent Weeks, head of the Theban Mapping Project, rediscovered Tomb KV5. It has proven to be the largest tomb in the Valley of the Kings, and originally contained the mummified remains of some of this king's estimated 52 sons. Approximately 150 corridors and tomb chambers have been located in this tomb as of 2006 and the tomb may contain as many as 200 corridors and chambers. It is believed that at least four of Ramesses's sons, including Meryatum, Sety, Amun-her-khepeshef (Ramesses's first-born son) and "the King's Principal Son of His Body, the Generalissimo Ramesses, justified" (i.e., deceased) were buried there from inscriptions, ostraca or canopic jars discovered in the tomb. Joyce Tyldesley writes that thus far
 no intact burials have been discovered and there have been little substantial funeral debris: thousands of potsherds, faience ushabti figures, beads, amulets, fragments of Canopic jars, of wooden coffins ... but no intact sarcophagi, mummies or mummy cases, suggesting that much of the tomb may have been unused. Those burials which were made in KV5 were thoroughly looted in antiquity, leaving little or no remains.

As the pharaoh in the Bible's Book of Exodus
Though scholars generally do not recognize the biblical portrayal of the Exodus as an actual historical event, various historical pharaohs have been proposed as the corresponding ruler at the time the story takes place, with Ramesses II as the most popular candidate for Pharaoh of the Exodus. He is cast in this role in the 1944 novella The Tables of the Law by Thomas Mann. Although not a major character, Ramesses appears in Joan Grant's So Moses Was Born, a first-person account from Nebunefer, the brother of Ramose, which paints a picture of the life of Ramose from the death of Seti, replete with the power play, intrigue, and assassination plots of the historical record, and depicting the relationships with Bintanath, Tuya, Nefertari, and Moses.

In film, Ramesses is played by Yul Brynner in Cecil B. DeMille's classic The Ten Commandments (1956). Here Ramesses is portrayed as a vengeful tyrant as well as the main antagonist of the film, ever scornful of his father's preference for Moses over "the son of [his] body".  The animated film The Prince of Egypt (1998) also features a depiction of Ramesses (voiced by Ralph Fiennes, for both the speaking and the singing), portrayed as Moses' adoptive brother, and ultimately as the film's villain with essentially the same motivations as in the earlier 1956 film. Joel Edgerton played Ramesses in the 2014 film Exodus: Gods and Kings. Sérgio Marone plays Ramesses in the 2015–2016 Brazilian telenovela series Os Dez Mandamentos.

In the 2013 miniseries The Bible, he is portrayed by Stewart Scudamore.

In popular culture
Ramesses is the basis for Percy Bysshe Shelley's poem "Ozymandias". Diodorus Siculus gives an inscription on the base of one of his sculptures as: "King of Kings am I, Osymandias. If anyone would know how great I am and where I lie, let him surpass one of my works." This is paraphrased in Shelley's poem.

The life of Ramesses II has inspired many fictional representations, including the historical novels of the French writer Christian Jacq, the Ramsès series; the graphic novel Watchmen, in which the character of Adrian Veidt uses Ramesses II to form part of the inspiration for his alter-ego, Ozymandias; Norman Mailer's novel Ancient Evenings, which is largely concerned with the life of Ramesses II, though from the perspective of Egyptians living during the reign of Ramesses IX; and the Anne Rice book The Mummy, or Ramses the Damned (1989), in which Ramesses was the main character. In The Kane Chronicles Ramesses is an ancestor of the main characters Sadie and Carter Kane. Ramesses II is one of the characters in the video game Civilization V.

The East Village underground rock band The Fugs released their song "Ramses II Is Dead, My Love" on their 1968 album It Crawled into My Hand, Honest.

See also
 List of pharaohs
 Nineteenth Dynasty of Egypt family tree

Notes

References

Bibliography

  Translations and (in the 1999 volume below) notes on all contemporary royal inscriptions naming the king.

Further reading

 
 Hasel, Michael G. 1998. Domination and Resistance: Egyptian Military Activity in the Southern Levant, 1300–1185 BC. Probleme der Ägyptologie 11. Leiden: Brill Publishers. 
 Hasel, Michael G. 2003. "Merenptah's Inscription and Reliefs and the Origin of Israel" in Beth Alpert Nakhai (ed.), The Near East in the Southwest: Essays in Honor of William G. Dever, pp. 19–44. Annual of the American Schools of Oriental Research 58. Boston: American Schools of Oriental Research. 
 
 James, T. G. H. 2000.  Ramesses II. New York: Friedman/Fairfax Publishers. A large-format volume by the former Keeper of Egyptian Antiquities at the British Museum, filled with colour illustrations of buildings, art, etc. related to Ramesses II
 The Epigraphic Survey, Reliefs and Inscriptions at Karnak III: The Bubastite Portal, Oriental Institute Publications, vol. 74 (Chicago): University of Chicago Press, 1954

External links 

 Egypt's Golden Empire: Ramesses II
 Ramesses II
 Ramesses II Usermaatre-setepenre (c. 1279–1213 BC)
 Egyptian monuments: Temple of Ramesses II
 List of Ramesses II's family members and state officials
 Newly discovered temple
 Full titulary of Ramesses II including variants

 
13th-century BC Pharaohs
Pharaohs of the Nineteenth Dynasty of Egypt
1213 BC deaths
1300s BC births
Ancient Egyptian mummies
Egyptian Museum
Seti I